Montlouis-sur-Loire (literally Montlouis on Loire) is a commune in the Indre-et-Loire department in central France.

It was mentioned in the 6th century as vicus montis Laudiacensis by Gregory of Tours.

Population

Events
Since 1987, the city hosts the month of September Jazz Festival in Touraine. In 2010, more than 20,000 people, 5 over a period of 10 days. To organize this event, an association was created in 1990 so that the festival can take its autonomy vis-à-vis the municipality. Today, about 200 volunteers involved in the organization.

Sights
 Chateau of Bourdaisière: It currently houses the Conservatory of tomato ( about 500 varieties).
 St. Lawrence Church: The original building was replaced late XI- XII start a single-nave church, which still remain the base of the tower and arched ass oven choir. The inscription "French Republic" was performed on the facade to 1881. On the left gable is visible a graffito of a barge, ex- voto Petty dating from the late 17th century. The church also has stained glass windows of the 20th century, one depicting the bombing of the bridge Montlouis -sur -Loire in May–June 1944, directed by the master glassmaker Fournier .
 The rectory, former mansion of the 16th century listed historical monument in 1927 would have sheltered the loves of Henri IV and Gabrielle d' Estrées. Ornate dormers and gables topped with sculpted seams of a shell, the building reflects the art of the Renaissance.
 Maison de la Loire: Museum dedicated to the Loire.
 The Heart city district: Great neighbourhood 'green' in the centre of the city consists of buildings for rental (social landlord) and the sale. Individual homes, businesses and a large media centre.
 The hiking trail GR 3, the pilgrimage to Compostela Via Turonensis and the circuit of the Loire by bike through Montlouis .
 Two railway bridges, built in 1846 and in 1989, crossing the Loire Montlouis height .

See also
 Communes of the Indre-et-Loire department

References

Communes of Indre-et-Loire